Rémy Geoffroy is a French Olympic middle-distance runner. He represented his country in the men's 1500 meters at the 1988 Summer Olympics. His time was a 3:41.68 in the first heat, and a 3:40.96 in the semifinals.

References

1963 births
Living people
French male middle-distance runners
Olympic athletes of France
Athletes (track and field) at the 1988 Summer Olympics
20th-century French people